The 2010–11 OK Liga Femenina was the third edition of Spain's premier women's rink hockey championship, running from 16 October 2010 to 4 June 2011. CP Mieres didn't take part in the competition, leaving it one team short. Thus the championship was contested by thirteen teams, with Girona CH and Vigo Stick CH replacing relegated teams CP Claret and CD Santa María del Pilar.

CP Voltregà, which also won the European League and the Copa de la Reina, won its first championship with an 8 points margin over CE Arenys and Girona CH. Gijón HC completed the European positions, while defending champion Cerdanyola CH was eighth, 18 points below them. CE Noia and Vigo Stick CH were relegated as the bottom teams, with the Galician team losing all matches.

Table

Top scorers

Copa de la Reina

The 2011 Copa de la Reina was the 6th edition of the Spanish women's roller hockey cup. It was played at the Polideportivo de Mata-Jove in Gijón, between the first three qualified teams after the first half of the season and Biesca Gijón as host team.

Voltregà won its fourth cup thanks to a golden goal scored in the final, played against Arenys de Munt.

References

ok liga femenina
ok liga femenina
OK Liga Femenina seasons